Semioscopis strigulana is a species of moth of the family Depressariidae. It is found in most of Europe (except most of the Balkan Peninsula, the Iberian Peninsula, Great Britain, Ireland, the Benelux, and Denmark) east to the eastern parts of the Palearctic realm.

The wingspan is 26–32 mm.

The larvae feed on Populus tremula.

References

External links
Semioscopis strigulana, Lepiforum.de

Semioscopis
Moths described in 1787
Moths of Europe